Paragordius tricuspidatus belongs to the phylum Nematomorpha, and is known for manipulating the behavior of its host, the cricket Nemobius sylvestris. In its larval stage, the worm is microscopic, but grows into a large worm inside its host after accidental ingestion since their eggs are laid at the edge of the water by rivers where crickets frequently reside. Upon ingestion, the worm nourishes upon its host and fills the entire body cavity of the cricket, until maturation, when the parasitic worm is ready to exit into water to complete its life cycle, maximizing its reproductive success. The worm induces a peculiar behavior on its cricket host, which causes it to leap into water whereby the parasitic worm can slither out and find its mate, while the cricket often perishes. Should the cricket be preyed upon by a predator, such as a fish or frog, the worm has the ability to not only escape from the host's body but also the predator's digestive system. The worm emerges from the predator unharmed and proceeds to live its life normally.

Studies of this parasitic worm have shown that the manipulative tactics of Paragordius tricuspidatus may be chemically based.  In the related Spinochordodes tellinii, another parasitic and brain-manipulative nematomorph, the parasitic worm produces certain effector molecules to manipulate the cricket's central nervous system to behave in ways that are out of the norm for the insect, as in jumping into water. In addition, S.tellinii produces a group of proteins in the Wnt family that are similar to insect proteins, which suggests molecular mimicry as a possible source for behavioral manipulation.

References

Nematomorpha
Parasitic protostomes
Parasites of insects
Suicide-inducing parasitism
Animals described in 1828